Onythes flavicosta is a moth of the family Erebidae first described by Herbert Druce in 1905. It is found in Peru.

References

Phaegopterina
Moths described in 1905